The  Rottweil–Lahr Black Forest Trail  is a four-day hiking route through the Black Forest in Germany from Rottweil to Lahr. The 99-kilometre-long hiking trail was laid out in 1935 and has been sponsored and maintained since then by the Black Forest Club. Its waymark is a red and blue diamond on a yellow background. Usually the blue side points to Rottweil and the red side to Lahr.

Short description 
The Rottweil–Lahr trail leaves the Neckar valley to run initially over open countryside with views of the heights of the Central Black Forest. On the second day, the path runs from Königsfeld through woods down to Hornberg in the Gutach valley. After a steep climb to the watershed between the Kinzig and Elz on the third day, the fourth day's journey leads into the Schutter valley to Lahr.

External links 

 Black Forest hiking service: web facility of the Black Forest Club for visualising the Black Forest trails on Google Maps with various overlays (trail network, waymarks, accommodation, ...)

Hiking trails in Baden-Württemberg
Transport in the Black Forest